"Wild" is a song by Japanese recording artist Namie Amuro from her ninth studio album Past<Future (2009). The song was released as the album's lead single on March 18, 2009, featuring the b-side "Dr." "Wild" was written and produced by Michio and T. Kura, while the latter track was written and produced by long-time collaborator Nao'ymt. The songs are electropop tracks, which features instrumentation from synthesizers and keyboards. "Wild" and "Dr." appeared as the advertising theme songs for Coca-Cola Zero and a Vidal Sassoon commercial.

The songs received positive reviews from music critics, who commended the songs' composition and production. Charting as a double a-side, "Wild/Dr." became Amuro's first number one single on the Japanese Oricon Singles Chart since her 2008 single "60s70s80s" and her tenth number one overall. Videos for both "Wild" and "Dr." were shot, the first being set on a futuristic planet while the latter was Amuro's first animated video. Both "Wild" and "Dr." have been included on two concert tours conducted by Amuro, including her Namie Amuro Best Fiction tour 2008–2009 and Namie Amuro Past<Future Tour 2010.

Background and composition
Reviving her sales decline with her 2007 album Play and her million-selling greatest hits album Best Fiction, Amuro begun recording her ninth studio album in early 2009. While she was promoting Best Fiction on her Best Fiction Tour, Amuro confirmed that all future singles would be revealed through commercial endorsements deals rather than being pre-released independently; both "Wild" and "Dr." appeared as the advertising theme songs for Coca-Cola Zero and a Vidal Sassoon commercial.

Written by Minchio and produced by T.Kura, "Wild" is an uptempo electropop song that incorporates synthesizers and keyboards by Nao'ymt. "Dr." is an R&B and Opera-inspired dance-pop song that was produced by Nao'ymt. "Dr." features a staccato marching band during its first and second verses, and both songs were recorded by Ryosuke Kataoka at Azabu-O-Studio, Tokyo. The songs were mastered by Tom Coyne at Sterling Sound Studios, New York City.

Critical reception
Both "Wild" and "Dr." received positive reviews from most music critics. Greg from Selective Hearing commended the production and composition of "Wild", saying its "definitely one of the more interesting tracks I’ve heard from Amuro in a while. It may take some a few spins to get used to." However, Greg felt the marching band and production through "Dr." "wrecks the flow of the song". Victoria Goldenberg from Purple Sky magazine selected "Wild" and "Dr." as Amuro's best tracks from the parent album and her career, stating "The shifting song structure and Bolero samples in "Dr." push the boundaries of the brief pop song, while the succinct, irresistibly punchy rhythms of "Wild" embrace them. Both songs are among Amuro's best." Bradley Stern from MuuMuse said "Wild" "is a squealing, pulsating electro-infused uptempo number. Namie’s newest is a sweat-worthy stomper with a gloss of dizzying future sounds and manic vocals. In a word: Delicious." Stern also commended the production and lyrical content of "Dr."

Commercial reception
"Wild/Dr." charted as a single on the Japanese Oricon Singles Chart and peaked at number one, Amuro's tenth number one and her first since her 1998 single "I Have Never Seen". The singles stayed in the chart for seventeen weeks, remaining Amuro's longest charting single in the chart since the 90s. The singles sold over 119,000 units in Japan, her seventh highest selling single in the 2000s era and was certified gold by the Recording Industry Association of Japan for exceeding shipments of 100,000 units. "Wild" entered at number twenty-seven on the Japan Hot 100, while "Dr." reached sixty-four. The following week, "Wild" reached number one; this became her first and only number one on the chart. It stayed in the charts for nine weeks. In June "Wild" was certified gold by the Recording Industry Association of Japan (RIAJ) for exceeding 100,000 ringtone sales.

Music video and promotion
"Wild" was directed by Cavier while "Dr." was directed by Junpei Mizusaki, Hidekazu Satō, and Yasuhiko Shimizu. "Wild" features Amuro on a futuristic planet and inside a castle that has her dancing to the track, while "Dr" marks her first animated music video. "Wild" drew comparisons to Janet Jackson's "Feedback" video for its galactic theme, setting, and choreography. Amuro uploaded a video that advertised both music videos, and they later appeared on the DVD version of the single.

Both "Wild" and "Dr." have been included on two concert tours conducted by Amuro, including her Namie Amuro Best Fiction tour 2008–2009 and Namie Amuro Past<Future Tour 2010. The songs were included in the live albums and DVD's of the tours.

Track listing 

CD Single
 "Wild" – 3:19
 "Dr." – 5:37
 "Wild" (Instrumental) – 3:19
 "Dr." (Instrumental) – 5:37

Worldwide digital release (from Past<Future)
 "Wild" – 3:19
 "Dr." – 5:37

Digital single
 "Wild" – 3:19
 "Dr." – 5:37

CD and DVD
 "Wild" – 3:19
 "Dr." – 5:37
 "Wild" (Instrumental) – 3:19
 "Dr." (Instrumental) – 5:37
 "Wild" (music video)
 "Dr." (music video)

Credits and personnel 

Song credits
 Namie Amuro – vocals (All tracks)
 T. Kura – composer, producer, instrumentation, arrangement (Track #1)
 Michio – composer, song writing, vocal production (Track #1)
 D.O.I. – mixing
 Recorded by Ryosuke Kataoka at Daimonion Recordings, Tokyo, Japan (Track #1)
 Nao'ymt – producer, composer, instrumentation, arrangement, song writing (Track #2)

Visual and video credits
 Hidekazu Sato – creative direction
 Katsuhiro Shimizu – art direction
 Shoji Uchida – photographer
 Akemi Nakano – make-up
 Shinichi Mita – stylist
 Cavier – video director (Track #1)
 Junpei Mizusaki – video director (Track #2)
 Hidekazu Satō (Track #2)
 Yasuhiko Shimizu (Track #2)

Credits adapted from the singles's liner notes.

Charts and certifications

Charts

Certification

Notes

References

Namie Amuro songs
2009 singles
Oricon Weekly number-one singles
Billboard Japan Hot 100 number-one singles
2009 songs
Avex Trax singles